Horovce may refer to:

Horovce, Michalovce District, village in Slovakia
Horovce, Púchov District, village in Slovakia